Vorup Frederiksberg Boldklub is a Danish amateur football club based in Haslund, a suburb of Randers, which plays in the sixth tier Jutland Series. Founded on 1 May 1930, the club plays its home games at XL Park Vorup – Ulvehøj, which has a 3,000 spectator capacity.

History 

Frederiksberg Boldklub was founded in the Randers suburb of Vorup on 1 May 1930 as the successor of Vorup Boldklub, which went bankrupt in 1927 after having existed since 1915. The new club was immediately inducted into the Jydsk Boldspil-Union (JBU), and initially played its home matches on its predecessor's home field until renting another the following year.  Three years later the club inaugurated its own field as well as a wooden club house, and won the championship of the JBU B-række.

In 1949 Frederiksberg Boldklub inaugurated a new stadium, and had a barracks originally built by the German military in Aalborg during World War II transported to Vorup. The following year the barracks were inaugurated as the club's new clubhouse.

In 1959 Frederiksberg Boldklub won the championship of the then 5th tier JBU Serie 1, and the next year changed its name to Vorup Frederiksberg Boldklub (Vorup FB).

Winning the championship of the then 4th tier Jyllandsserien in 1965 the club secured promotion to the 3. Division, and in 1971 began playing its home matches at the larger Ulvehøj Idrætscenter (in 2012 renamed XL Park Vorup – Ulvehøj) in the Randers suburb of Haslund. A new clubhouse was inaugurated adjacent the same year,  which was expanded in 1986.

From August 1970 women also played football in association with Vorup FB, and from the onset participated in the tournament established for Jutland and Funen the following year. Already in 1971 and 1972 Vorup FB's women won the local championship and thus promotion to the then 2nd tier  Jyllandsserien, and when in 1972, 1973, and 1974 they won Dagbladets Cup they were directed not to play for it again as they were simply too good compared to their competitors.

On 24 January 1973 Vorup FB established an actual women's division, and the same year Vorup FB's women won the championship of Jyllandsserien and thus promotion to the then 1st tier Damedivisionen. From 1988 two of the clubs female players, Mette Nielsen and Kamma Flæng, played for the Denmark women's national football team, the former e.g. at the 1991 World Cup in China and the latter e.g. at the 1996 Olympic Games in Atlanta.

In 1993 Vorup FB's women qualified for the Danish Women's Cup Final, but lost the match in extra time. Due to economic difficulties the club had to quit women's football at the elite level in 2000, but today the economy is back on track and Vorup FB's women play in the 2nd tier 1. division.

On 1 January 2003 Vorup FB was one of the six founding clubs of Randers FC which today plays in the 1st tier Superligaen, while Vorup FB has returned to playing in Jyllandsserien.

Colours 

Vorup FB's colours are blue and white.

Stadium 

Vorup FB plays its home matches on XL Park Vorup – Ulvehøj, which was built to hold 3,000 spectators and has an attendance record of 2,300 people. Artificial turf and a 19 m2 big screen has made XL Park Vorup often voted the best stadium in their league.

Achievements 
 Quarter finalist 1965 Danish Cup

Club officials 

 Chairman: Finn Christiansen
 First team coach: Michael Hansen
 First team coach (Women): Peter Uhrskov
 Managing director: Thomas Raaby Pedersen
 Chief groundsman: Jes Petersen

References 

 Danmarks Stadions (19.06.2002) Ulvehøj Idrætscenter. Skanderborg, Denmark; UnoEuro Danmark
 Larsen, Mads D. & Kristensen, Lykke Møller (2006). De jyske fodboldklubbers historie – Milepæle, bedrifter og profiler. Om udviklingen i jysk fodbold fortalt med klubbens egne ord, 2. Bind, M til Å. Viby J, Denmark; Jydsk Boldspil-Union
 Randers FC A/S (2011). HISTORIE. Copenhagen, Denmark; Larsen Data ApS
 Vorup FB Damefodbold's website

External links 
 Vorup FB – official site

Football clubs in Denmark
1930 establishments in Denmark